The Archbishop of Liverpool is the ordinary of the Roman Catholic Archdiocese of Liverpool and metropolitan of the Province of Liverpool (also known as the Northern Province) in England.

The see is in the City of Liverpool, where the Archbishop's cathedra or seat is located in the Metropolitan Cathedral of Christ the King, which was dedicated on 14 May 1967.

The Archbishop's residence is Archbishop's House, Salisbury Road, Liverpool.

The current archbishop is the Most Reverend Malcolm McMahon, who was appointed by Pope Francis on 21 March 2014 and enthroned at Liverpool Metropolitan Cathedral on 1 May 2014, the Feast of Saint Joseph the Worker, before a congregation of three thousand.

History
After the Reformation, the Roman Catholic hierarchy in England, Scotland, and Wales was abandoned and became under the authority of prefects and vicars apostolics. In 1688, England and Wales were divided into four apostolic vicariates: the London, Midland, Northern, and Western districts. The Liverpool area came under the Northern District, and it remained until the creation of the Lancashire District in 1840. The Lancashire District consisted of the historic counties of Lancashire and Cheshire, together with the Isle of Man.

On the restoration of the hierarchy in England and Wales in 1850, thirteen dioceses were established. Most of the Lancashire District was replaced by the dioceses of Liverpool and Salford. The new Diocese of Liverpool comprised the hundreds of West Derby, Leyland, Amounderness and Lonsdale in Lancashire, plus the Isle of Man. In its early period, the diocese was a suffragan see of the Archdiocese of Westminster, but it was elevated to the status of a metropolitan archdiocese on 28 October 1911, with the archbishop having jurisdiction over the Province of Liverpool.

List of Ordinaries of Liverpool

Roman Catholic Bishops of Liverpool

Roman Catholic Archbishops of Liverpool

References

Bibliography

 
 

 
 
Northern England